Jukka Lehtovaara (born 15 March 1988) is a Finnish retired football goalkeeper.

Club career

He made his debut in 2006. During the 2007 Lehtovaara gained his place as the starting goalie for the team. After the season, he was nominated as the goalkeeper of the year and rookie of the year in Finland. He is generally considered as one of the most promising footballers in Finland. 2009 he was nominated again as the goalkeeper of the year after a terrific season and thus has stirred up a lot of interest in bigger clubs. He continued dominating in the 2010 season as well, winning the goalkeeper of the year award again.

Lehtovaara has played several caps for Finland on different junior levels and he is currently a member of the Finland national under-21 football team. He has also visited the training camps of, for example, West Ham United FC, Liverpool F.C., Chelsea FC, Everton FC and Fulham FC. On 4 November 2010 he is on a one-week trial at West Bromwich.

On 8 December 2014, he signed a two-year contract with FC Inter Turku, but announced his retirement from the game two years later in October 2016 due to recurring injuries.

International career

Lehtovaara made his debut for Finnish national squad on 21 May 2010 against Estonia, playing the first half in a 2–0 away defeat.

Honours
 Finnish Cup: 2010
 Finnish League Cup: 2012
 Veikkausliiga goalkeeper of the year: 2007, 2009, 2010

References

External links
 

1988 births
Living people
Footballers from Turku
Association football goalkeepers
Finnish footballers
Finland under-21 international footballers
Turun Palloseura footballers
Veikkausliiga players
Finland international footballers